Khusheh Darreh may refer to:
 Khusheh Darreh, Sarshiv
 Khusheh Darreh, Ziviyeh